Johannes Petrus Hoogenboom (circa 1778 – 4 August 1808) was a colonial administrator on the Gold Coast, who served as acting governor-general of the Dutch Gold Coast between 21 July 1807 and his death on 4 August 1808.

Biography 

Johannes Petrus Hoogenboom was born in Rotterdam to Johannes Petrus Hoogenboom senior and Catharina Schipperheijn. He was baptised on 4 May 1778 in Het Steiger.

He made a career in the colonial administration of the Dutch Gold Coast and became acting governor-general after the death of Pieter Linthorst. During his time in office the Dutch cemetery was constructed. In an ironic twist of fate, Hoogenboom became one of the first people interred in the Dutch cemetery, after he was murdered by an angry mob outside the officer's club in Elmina on 4 August 1808.

Notes

References 
 
 
 
 

1778 births
1808 deaths
Colonial governors of the Dutch Gold Coast